The 1929–30 Chicago Black Hawks season was the team's fourth season in the NHL. After a two-year absence, the Hawks would return to the playoffs, losing to the Montreal Canadiens in the first round of the playoffs.

Regular season
They were coming their second straight season of winning only 7 games, and finishing in last place in the league.  The Black Hawks would make yet another coaching change, hiring Tom Shaughnessy.  The Hawks would surprise the league, getting off to a 10–8–3 start, however, the team would fire Shaughnessy and replace him with Bill Tobin.  Tobin would lead Chicago to a record of 11–10–2, and they would finish the year with a 21–18–5 record, tripling their win total from the previous season, to finish in second place in the American Division, and make the playoffs for the second time in team history.  The Black Hawks would set team records with wins, points and goals for, and finish above .500 for the first time in team history.

Despite the brand new Chicago Stadium being built and ready at the start of the season, the Hawks would play a few home games at Chicago Coliseum due to a disagreement with the Chicago Stadium Corporation, however it was resolved in December, and the Hawks moved in.

Chicago was led offensively by young players Tom Cook, who at 22, led the club with 30 points, and Johnny Gottselig, at 23 years old, leading the Black Hawks with 21 goals.  Team captain Duke Dutkowski would lead all Black Hawk defensemen with 17 points in 44 games.

In goal, Chuck Gardiner would once again get all the playing time, setting a Black Hawks team record with 21 wins, and have 3 shutouts, along with a 2.42 GAA.

November
The Black Hawks opened the 1929–30 season on the road in Toronto on November 14, as the Black Hawks and Toronto Maple Leafs fought to a 2–2 tie. The Black Hawks hosted the Montreal Canadiens two nights later, on November 16, in their home opener, in which the two teams battled to a 4–4 draw in the Hawks' first game at Chicago Stadium. Mush March scored the first goal in the new arena. The Hawks would record their first win of the season on the road as they defeated the New York Americans 5–1.

Chicago returned home to face the Ottawa Senators on November 21. The Hawks Art Somers recorded a hat trick, as he scored three goals against the Senators, however, Ottawa held on to defeat the Hawks 6–5 in overtime. Three nights later, the Hawks would record their first win at their new arena, as Chuck Gardiner stopped every shot he faced, leading Chicago to a 4–0 win over the Detroit Cougars. The Hawks would lose their final game of November, dropping a 3–2 decision to the New York Rangers.

Chicago finished November with a 2–2–2 record in six games, earning six points. The club was in third place in the American Division, four points behind the first place Boston Bruins.

December
The Black Hawks opened December with a game against the first place Boston Bruins, and Chicago defeated Boston 3–1 after a very solid performance by Chuck Gardiner. Chicago would open the month of December with five consecutive victories, including a 4–2 win over the New York Americans on December 8 in which Earl Miller recorded a hat trick.

The Hawks winning streak was snapped on December 19, as the Detroit Cougars defeated Chicago 4–3. This led to the beginning of a three game losing skid for the club. The Black Hawks stopped the losing streak with a solid 3–1 win over the Ottawa Senators on Christmas Eve, and followed it up with a 4–3 win against the Montreal Maroons two nights later. The Hawks ended the month with a 4–3 loss to the Toronto Maple Leafs on December 29.

The Black Hawks earned a 7–4–0 record during the month of December. This brought their overall win–loss record to 9–6–2 in the season, earning 20 points and tied with the New York Rangers for second place in the American Division, ten points behind the first place Boston Bruins.

January
Chicago opened the 1930s with an overtime loss by the score of 3–2 to the Montreal Canadiens on New Year's Day on home ice. The Hawks losing skid extended to three games, as the Detroit Cougars shutout the Hawks 4–0 in Chicago. In the back end of the home-and-home series, the Black Hawks ended their losing streak, as they tied the Cougars 1–1 in Detroit.

The Black Hawks then returned home for a three game home stand, and Chicago would go a perfect 3–0–0 in these games, highlighted by a huge 2–1 victory over the first place Boston Bruins on January 16. The Hawks ended January with five games on the road, in which Chicago earned a record of 2–3–0 in those games, earning wins over the Pittsburgh Pirates and Ottawa Senators.

The club earned a 5–5–1 record during January. The Black Hawks overall record at the end of January was 14–11–3, earning 31 points, and in third place. Chicago was one point behind the New York Rangers for second place, but fell to nineteen points behind the division leading Boston Bruins.

February
The Black Hawks seven game road trip continued with a 6–0 loss to the Toronto Maple Leafs on February 1, which was the second consecutive game that the team was shutout, as they lost to the Montreal Canadiens 1–0 in overtime on January 30. In the final game of the road trip, Chicago returned to the win column, as they beat the Detroit Cougars 4–1.

The Hawks then began a five game home stand, and started it off with a 3–2 win over the Montreal Maroons. Chicago would then lose the next four games of the home stand, dropping their overall record to .500 at 16–16–3.

Chicago finished off February on a quick two game road trip, in which they ended their four game slide with a 2–0 win over the Montreal Maroons, followed by a 1–1 draw against the New York Rangers.

The Black Hawks slumped to a 3–5–1 record in February, which was their first losing month of the season. Chicago's overall record at the end of the month was 17–16–4, earning 38 points and in a tie for second place with the New York Rangers. The Hawks were out of the running for first place though, as the Boston Bruins were 29 points ahead of Chicago.

March
The Black Hawks started off March back at home with a 3–0 shutout victory over the Pittsburgh Pirates, extending their unbeaten streak to three games. The New York Rangers and Black Hawks fought to a 1–1 tie Chicago's next game.

The club went on their final road trip of the season, and started it off with a 4–3 win against the Pirates on March 8, extending their unbeaten streak to five games. The Hawks streak was snapped the following night, as the New York Americans beat Chicago 5–2. The road trip concluded with a close 4–3 loss to the Boston Bruins.

The Hawks returned home for their final two games, and defeated the Boston Bruins for the third time in the season, as Johnny Gottselig scored the overtime winner in a 3–2 win over Boston. The Black Hawks earned a 3–3–0 record against Boston during the season, an impressive feat, as Boston finished the season with a 38–5–1 record, losing only two other games throughout the year. The regular season concluded on March 18, as Chicago defeated the Toronto Maple Leafs 4–1.

Chicago had a very solid 4–2–1 record in the month of March, which brought their final regular season record to 21–18–5, earning 56 points, which was a club record. Chicago finished the season in second place in the American Division.

Season standings

Record vs. opponents

Schedule and results

A – played at Atlantic City, New Jersey.
B – played at Peace Bridge, Buffalo, New York.

Playoffs
After a two-year absence, the Hawks would return to the playoffs, and face the second place team from the Canadian Division, the Montreal Canadiens, in the opening round in a two-game, total goal series.

The series opened at Chicago Stadium, however, despite a solid 38 save effort by goaltender Charlie Gardiner, the Canadiens defeated the Black Hawks 1–0 on a third period goal by Newsy Lalonde. Canadiens goaltender George Hainsworth made 34 saves for the win.

The second game moved to the Montreal Forum, as the Black Hawks were in a must-win situation. The Hawks Ty Arbour opened the scoring with the lone goal of the first period, scoring 1:38 into the game. Montreal tied the game midway through the second period on a power play goal by Howie Morenz. The Black Hawks Earl Miller restored the lead for Chicago just over three minutes later, as the Hawks led 2–1 after the second period. In the third period, the two teams did not score a goal, as the two-game total goal series ended in a 2–2 tie, forcing overtime. It wouldn't be until the third overtime period before a goal was scored, as Howie Morenz beat Charlie Gardiner midway through the third overtime period, as Montreal won the series by a 3–2 score.

Montreal Canadiens 3, Chicago Black Hawks 2

Player statistics

Scoring leaders

Goaltending

Playoff stats

Scoring leaders

Goaltending

References

 SHRP Sports
 The Internet Hockey Database
 National Hockey League Guide & Record Book 2007

Chicago
Chicago
Chicago Blackhawks seasons